Bruce Yandle (born August 12, 1933) is Dean Emeritus of Clemson University's College of Business and Behavioral Science and Alumni Distinguished Professor of Economics Emeritus at Clemson. He is a Distinguished Adjunct Professor of Economics at the Mercatus Center, a faculty member with George Mason University's Capitol Hill Campus, and a Senior Fellow with the Property and Environment Research Center (PERC). He has served as executive director of the Federal Trade Commission in Washington, D.C., and served as senior economist on the President's Council on Wage and Price Stability from 1976 to 1978.

Biography
Yandle received his bachelor's degree from Mercer University and his MBA and PhD from Georgia State University. His main research interest are public choice, regulation and free-market environmentalism. He has been president of the Association of Private Enterprise Education, member and chairman of the South Carolina State Board of Economic Advisors, and member and chairman of the Spartanburg Methodist College board of trustees. He produces a quarterly newsletter on the economy distributed by George Mason University's Mercatus Center.

He was the first to put forth the story of the bootlegger and the Baptist, which describes how economic and ethical interests ally with one another to promote regulation, even though the two groups would never interact otherwise.

Prior to starting his career in academia, he had a fifteen-year career in the industrial machinery business. He lives with his wife in Clemson, South Carolina.

Publications
 Bootleggers and Baptists: How Economic Forces and Moral Persuasion Interact to Shape Regulatory Politics 
 Taking the Environment Seriously 
 The Political Limits of Environmental Regulation: Tracking the Unicorn 
 Land Rights 
 Common Law and Common Sense for the Environment 
 Regulation by Litigation

External links
 Profile at Mercatus
 Profile at PERC
 Yandle 2008 economic forecast
 

Public choice theory
1933 births
Living people
Mercer University alumni
Clemson University faculty
Georgia State University alumni
American economists
American non-fiction environmental writers
American political writers
American male non-fiction writers
Mercatus Center